5.5 mm to 1 foot scale (1:55.4 or 1:55) is used for modelling narrow gauge railways.  gauge track is used to represent  to  gauge prototypes.  gauge track is used to represent  gauge prototypes. Very narrow industrial or rural lines can be represented by N-gauge (9 mm gauge) on OO9-track do give . These 5.5mm could be called "5.5-ind".

History
5.5mm scale narrow gauge model railways were developed by GEM in 1963, using  gauge track, which was the smallest commercially available gauge at the time (TT gauge). GEM produced kits for locomotives and rolling stock from the Ffestiniog and Talyllyn railways. Following the development of N gauge, using  gauge track, the popularity of 5.5 mm scale declined as modellers adopted OO9 which could combine N gauge track and mechanisms with the widely supported 4 mm scale.

However 5.5mm scale remained in use and, following an article on the Gwynant Valley Railway by Malcolm Savage in Railway Modeller, October 1984, the 5.5mm Association was formed. The tooling for the GEM kits was purchased by Malcolm Savage in 1996 and he reintroduced and upgraded the range. Following Malcolm's death in 2018 the tooling was purchased by 55th Studios. Worsley Works has also produced "scratch aids" for the scale. More recently, 3D printing techniques have expanded the range of available models even further, while in the USA there's a quietly flourishing 3' gauge modelling fraternity, using OO track and mechanisms.

There are many other sources of modelling aids for 5.5 mm scale. Siku's Super Series of vehicles are to 1/55 scale, while in the military modelling and wargaming world, 28mm scale (the height of a 6' tall figure) is a close match. Historical and contemporary figues, buildings and accessories are all readily available from a variety of manufacturers.

See also 
 List of narrow-gauge model railway scales

References

External links
 5.5mm Association

Narrow gauge railway modelling